The Flèche du Sud, is a road bicycle race held annually in Luxembourg. It is currently organised as a 2.2 event on the UCI Europe Tour.

Winners

References

External links
 
 

Cycle races in Luxembourg
UCI Europe Tour races
Recurring sporting events established in 1949
1949 establishments in Luxembourg
Spring (season) events in Luxembourg